Michaelmas and Upolu Cays is a national park in Queensland, Australia,  northwest of Brisbane and  east of Cairns.  It comprises two small cays on Michaelmas Reef, which forms the north-eastern section of the Arlington reef complex, within the Great Barrier Reef.

Flora and fauna

Plants
The vegetation on Michaelmas Cay is characteristic of cays found on the outer barrier reef.  Low-growing, it consists of beach spinifex, stalky grass, goatsfoot, bulls-head vine, sea purslane and tar vine. Nutrients fertilising the vegetation come from seabird droppings and carcasses.  The smaller Upolu Cay is un-vegetated.

Animals

Michaelmas Cay is important as a breeding site for several species of terns.  It has been identified by BirdLife International as an Important Bird Area (IBA) because it supports over 1% of the world populations of greater and lesser crested terns. Sooty terns and common noddies also breed there.  Other terns that have nested on the cay in the past include roseate and black-naped terns.

Green turtles sometimes nest on the cays.  The surrounding reefs have a rich marine fauna, including giant clams.

See also

 Protected areas of Queensland

References

National parks of Far North Queensland
Protected areas established in 1975
Important Bird Areas of Queensland
Islands on the Great Barrier Reef
1975 establishments in Australia
Uninhabited islands of Australia